The 1972 All-East football team consists of American football players chosen by various selectors as the best players at each position among the Eastern colleges and universities during the 1972 NCAA University Division football season.

Offense

Quarterback
 John Hufnagel, Penn State (AP-1)

Running backs
 Cleveland Cooper, Navy (AP-1)
 Dick Jauron, Yale (AP-1)
 Jim Jennings, Rutgers (AP-1)

Tight end
 Larry Christoff, Rutgers (AP-1)

Wide receivers
 David Knight, William & Mary (AP-1)

Interior linemen
 Bill Brown, Princeton (AP-1)
 Dave Lapham, Syracuse (AP-1)
 Bob Norton, Dartmouth (AP-1)
 Bill Singletary, Temple (AP-1)

Center
 Gerald Schultze, West Virginia (AP-1)

Defense

Ends
 Bruce Bannon, Penn State (AP-1)
 Steve Bogosian, Army (AP-1)

Tackles
 Carl Barisich, Princeton (AP-1)
 Joe Ehrmann, Syracuse (AP-1)

Linebackers
 Bob Lally, Cornell (AP-1)
 Kevin Reilly, Villanova (AP-1)
 John Sorupan, Penn State (AP-1)

Defensive backs 
 Greg Ducatte, Penn State (AP-1)
 Frank Polito, Villanova (AP-1)
 John Provost, Holy Cross (AP-1)
 Matt Wotell, Army (AP-1)

Key
 AP = Associated Press
 UPI = United Press International

See also
 1972 College Football All-America Team

References

All-Eastern
All-Eastern college football teams